Lake Chiuta is a shallow lake on the border between Malawi and Mozambique. It lies to the north of Lake Chilwa and to the south of Lake Amaramba, which has no outlet, and the lakes are separated by a sandy ridge. Both lakes lie in a graben which runs northeast–southwest, east of the main African Rift Valley.

Lake Chiuta is 3–4 meters deep and ranges in size from 25 to 130 square kilometers, depending on the season and rainfall. Lake Chiuta and Amaramba is intermittently linked to the Lugenda River, a tributary of the Ruvuma River.

Lake Chiuta can desiccate completely (Owen et al. 198?)

Mean Depth:  / average surface area:  / average volume:  / encatchment area:  (Ojda 1994)

Predominant commercial fish species are Oreochromis shiranus shiranus (Chambo), Clarias gariepinus (Mlamba), and Barbus paludinosus (Matemba). 37 fish species were recorded in total. (Ojda 1994)

Dominating aquatic macrophytes are Potamogeton welwitschii + Ceratophyllum demersum (submerged), Eleocharis dulcis, Oryza barthii, Vossia cuspidata, etc. (Ojda 1994)

References
 Dawson, A.L. (1970). "The Geology of the Lake Chiuta Area". Geological Survey Dept., Ministry of Natural Resources Malawi. Government Printer, Zomba, Malawi
 Owen, R.B & R. Crossley, 198?. "Recent sedimentation in Lakes Chilwa and Chiuta, Malawi". Dept. of Geography and Earth Science, University of Malawi, Zomba, Malawi
 Ojda, Lutz W. (1994). "Der Chiuta See in Malawi - Studie eines fluktuierenden tropischen Ökosystems mit Fokus auf dessen maximalen fischereilichen Dauerertrags (MSY) und seiner wirtschaftlichen Bedeutung für die angrenzende Kawinga-Ebene" (Monographie) Dissertation / Universität Hamburg / IHF
 Thieme, Michelle L. (2005). Freshwater Ecoregions of Africa and Madagascar: A Conservation Assessment. Island Press, Washington DC. pp. 173–175.

Chiuta
Chiuta
Malawi–Mozambique border
Endorheic basins of Africa
Chiuta
Geography of Southern Region, Malawi